Dennis M. Davin is the current Pennsylvania Secretary of Community and Economic Development, having been nominated by Pennsylvania Governor Tom Wolf and confirmed in May 2015. Previously, he served as Director of the Allegheny County Department of Economic Development.

Biography 
Before his appointment, Secretary Davin served as Director of the Allegheny County Department of Economic Development (ACED), where he was responsible for creating and executing the economic development strategy for Allegheny County. He managed funding from local, state and federal sources to implement economic development activities such as site development, new job creation initiatives, community development, and affordable housing for approximately 1.25 million citizens in 130 municipalities. One project he is specifically proud of is the Greater Allegheny Passage which is a trail system that goes from Point State Park in Pittsburgh all the way to Washington, D.C. in Georgetown.

References

Living people
People from Allegheny County, Pennsylvania
State cabinet secretaries of Pennsylvania
Year of birth missing (living people)